Jockey is an unincorporated community in Lane Township, Warrick County, in the U.S. state of Indiana.

History
Some say Jockey was named on account of selling horses, while others believe the name reflects the community's "shrewd dealings".

Geography

References

Unincorporated communities in Warrick County, Indiana
Unincorporated communities in Indiana